Desmond Kuek Bak Chye is a Singaporean former lieutenant-general who served as Chief of Defence Force between 2007 and 2010. 

After leaving the Singapore Armed Forces (SAF), Kuek had served as Permanent Secretary for Environment and Water Resource between 2010 and 2012, and the president and chief executive officer of the SMRT Corporation between 2012 and 2018.

Education
Kuek was educated at the Anglo-Chinese School and Anglo-Chinese Junior College, before he was awarded the Singapore Armed Forces Overseas Scholarship in 1982 to study at the University of Oxford, where he graduated with a Master of Arts degree in engineering science. 

He subsequently went on to complete a Master of Public Administration degree in macroeconomics and statistics at Harvard University.

Military Career
Kuek enlisted in the Singapore Armed Forces (SAF) in 1981. He attended the Infantry Officer Basic Course in Fort Benning, USA and was awarded the Distinguished Allied Leadership Graduate in 1985. He was the top student at the Army's Company Tactics Course in 1987 and Battalion Tactics Course in 1989, held in SAFTI, Singapore. He also attended the Command and Staff Course at Camberley Staff College in the United Kingdom in 1991. He rose rapidly through the ranks, receiving the following appointments: 
 Commanding Officer, 41st Battalion Singapore Armoured Regiment;
 Head of Defence Studies Department, Ministry of Defence;
 Commander, 4th Singapore Armoured Brigade;
 Assistant Chief of the General Staff (Operations);
 Commander, 3rd Division; 
 Chief of Staff, General Staff;
 Director, Joint Intelligence Directorate;
In 2003, Kuek succeeded Ng Yat Chung as Chief of Army. On 23 March 2007, Kuek succeeded Ng again but as the Chief of Defence Force (CDF).

Kuek relinquished his appointment as the CDF on 31 March 2010 and was succeeded by Neo Kian Hong.

Political career 
After leaving the military, Kuek served as a Permanent Secretary in the Ministry of the Environment and Water Resources from 1 July 2010 to 30 September 2012. During his tenure, he co-chaired the Environment and Water Technologies (Clean Water) Executive Committee and the Steering Committee on CleanTech Park.

Business career

SMRT Corporation Limited (2012–2018)
On 1 October 2012, Kuek was appointed President and Group CEO of SMRT Corporation, a transport company providing rail, bus, and taxi services.

As group CEO, he was also responsible for taking the company private by selling it to Temasek Holdings on 29 September 2016.

Kuek led SMRT's rail transformation effort to renew and improve the ageing North-South and East-West Lines (NSEWL), Singapore's oldest, longest and most heavily-used MRT lines. The multi-year, multi-project renewal effort spearheaded by Singapore's Land Transport Authority (LTA) involves six major components and will stretch into the early 2020s:

 Sleeper replacement: 188,000 wooden sleepers were replaced with concrete sleepers.
 Power rail replacement: Some 200 km of Third Rails (Power Rails) and insulators were renewed.
 Re-signalling project: The legacy Westinghouse fixed-block system (used since the late 1980s) was replaced by a communications-based train control system supplied by Thales.
 Power supply system renewal
 Track circuit replacement
 Introduction of new trains

Working in partnership with LTA, three of the six projects were completed under Kuek's watch. These are the projects to renew the sleepers and power rails, and the re-signalling effort. A project with Otis Elevator Company to renew NSEWL escalators throughout the network began in August 2016 and is expected to be completed in the early 2020s.

In his review of Kuek's tenure, the Straits Times Senior Transport Correspondent Christopher Tan noted that Kuek led SMRT "during what was probably its most tumultuous period".

Tan wrote: "But even though his tenure was marred by incidents such as track deaths and tunnel flooding, he was part of the team – along with SMRT Trains chief Lee Ling Wee – which rebuilt the reliability of the North-South and East-West lines. As of the end of March this year, the North-South Line clocked an average of 604,000 train-km before a delay lasting more than five minutes; for the East-West Line, the figure was 272,000 train-km. These were some 10 times better than the lines' performance in 2011. The number of major breakdowns – those lasting more than 30 minutes – on Singapore's two oldest lines has also decreased to just one in the first quarter. At their worst, the two lines chalked up nearly one such breakdown each month. The Circle Line, which is likewise operated by SMRT, also posted a tenfold improvement in reliability over the same period to 1.8 million train-km between delays."

In a press statement on 18 April 2018, SMRT announced that former CDF Neo will replace Kuek as group CEO from 1 August.

Genium & Co (2018–present) 
On 24 November 2018, the Straits Times reported that Kuek had founded a leadership consultancy called Genium & Co. The company is helmed by two former SAF officers, Fred Tan and Ang Yau Choon, who serve as managing directors. Tan headed the Singapore Armed Forces' Centre for Leadership Development while Ang served as commander of the SAF Commando Training Institute. Genium's principal activities are in organisational transformation, strategy execution, crisis leadership, experiential learning and performance excellence.

UBS (2019 to 2022) 
Kuek joined Swiss investment bank UBS on 18 February 2019 as its Singapore-based divisional vice-chairman for global wealth management. UBS announced Kuek's appointment in a statement issued on 4 February 2019. 

At UBS, he was concurrent Global Head of the Sustainable Finance Group, which is a commercially focused, cross-divisional group that supports the implementation of sustainability and impact strategy relating to sustainable finance across the firm. Kuek also chaired the UBS Optimus Foundation and directed the management of the UBS’ Singapore Program for Employability and Resilience (SUPER).

Temasek Trust (2023 to present) 
In September 2022, The Straits Times reported that Kuek would join Temasek Trust, the philanthropic arm of Singapore's state-owned investment company, Temasek, as its executive director and chief executive officer from January 2023.

Miscellaneous
He was a member of the Centre for Strategic Futures Advisory Board and the Advisory Group for Civil Service Governance & Leadership (Human Resource). He sits on the Civil Service College Board and chairs its audit committee. He is currently a member of the Advisory Board at SAP Asia Pacific & Japan, Engineering College Advisory Board at Nanyang Technological University, and International Advisory Committee at the Lee Kuan Yew Centre for Innovative Cities at Singapore University of Technology and Design (SUTD).

He also held directorships on the boards of the following companies: Housing and Development Board, from 2001 to 2003; International Enterprise Singapore, in 2005; JTC Corporation, from 2007 to 2010; Defence Science and Technology Agency, from 2007 to 2010; ST Engineering and its various subsidiaries, from 1994 to 2010.

Awards
Public Administration Medal (Military) (Gold), in 2002.
Meritorious Service Medal (Military), in 2009.
Commander, Legion of Honour, USA in 2010.
Order of Resplendent Banner with Grand Cordon, Taiwan in 2009.
Legion D'Honneur (Commandeur), France in 2008.
Panglima Gagah Angkatan Tentara (Kehormat), Malaysia in 2008.
Knight Grand Cross (First Class) of the Most Exalted Order of the White Elephant, Thailand in 2008.
Darjah Paduka Keberanian Laila Terbilang Yang Amat Gemilang Darjah Pertama, Brunei in 2007.
Bintang Kartika Eka Paksi Utama, Indonesia in 2006.

References

|-

|-

|-

Alumni of the University of Oxford
Anglo-Chinese Junior College alumni
Anglo-Chinese School alumni
Commandeurs of the Légion d'honneur
Harvard Kennedy School alumni
Graduates of the Staff College, Camberley
Living people
Chiefs of Defence Force (Singapore)
Chiefs of the Singapore Army
1963 births
Singaporean people of Teochew descent